Peziza fimeti is a species of ascomycete fungus belonging to the family Pezizaceae. Found in Europe and North America, the fungus grows on cow dung. The asci (spore-producing cells) are cylindrical (or nearly so), with dimensions of up to 280 µm long and 18 µm in diameter. The spores are ellipsoid and measure 8 by 16 µm.

References

External links

Pezizaceae
Fungi described in 1871
Fungi of Europe
Fungi of North America